Orazio Cremona (born 1 July 1989) is a South African athlete specialising in the shot put. He finished seventh at the 2014 World Indoor Championships.

His personal bests in the event are 21.12 metres outdoors (Potchefstroom 2017) and 20.49 metres indoors (Sopot 2014).

Competition record

References

External links
 

1989 births
Living people
South African male shot putters
South African people of Italian descent
Commonwealth Games competitors for South Africa
Athletes (track and field) at the 2014 Commonwealth Games
Athletes (track and field) at the 2018 Commonwealth Games
Sportspeople from Johannesburg
Italian South African
World Athletics Championships athletes for South Africa
Athletes (track and field) at the 2019 African Games
African Games competitors for South Africa
South African Athletics Championships winners
African Championships in Athletics winners